Cochasquí is the "most extensive and most important complex" of pre-Columbian and pre-Inca Empire ruins in northern Ecuador.

The site also has several small museums: an archaeological museum, two ethnographic museums, a botanical garden, and a museum with musical instruments and other items. The Mojanda volcano with a maximum elevation of  looms over the site.

Description

The pyramids and other features of Cochasqui were constructed between 950 CE and the Spanish conquest in the 1530s. Their construction is attributed by archaeologists to the Quitu-Cara culture of the Cara people and/or the Caranqui people. The Cara and the Caranqui may have been the same people. Prior to the Inca conquest in the late 15th century, the Andes area of northern Ecuador seems to have been divided into many chiefdoms or statelets made up of people with similar languages and cultures. The Cayambe chiefdom may have controlled the Cochasqui area when the Incas arrived.

The 15 pyramids at Cochasqui include nine with ramps and six without ramps. The primary construction material used in the pyramids is a soft volcanic stone called cangahua. Vulnerable to weathering and erosion the pyramids have survived because they were overgrown with grass.

Archaeologists have theorized that Cochasqui was a ceremonial and astronomical center, used for meteorological purposes to calculate solstices and aid in determining when crops should be planted. Leaders and the elite may have lived on the flat-topped pyramids and the site may have had military and political importance. The tolas were used as burial mounds as many skeletons have been discovered there.

Archaeologists estimate that the pre-Columbian community of Cochasqui, including the intensely-cultivated farmland surrounding the pyramids and tolas, supported a population of 3,000 people.

Importance

The Inca assault on Cochasqui probably began at the same time of just after the Inca victory, after a long struggle, at the Pambamarca Fortress Complex,  to the southeast. In the opinion of one scholar, Pambamarca fell to the Incas about 1505.

Cochasqui has acquired a symbolic importance in the history of Ecuador. A legend describes the Inca conquest of Cochasqui, including the union of Quilago (born c. 1485), the Queen of Cochasqui and the Inca Emperor, Huayna Capac. For a two-year period, the Incas were unable to defeat the armies of Quilago. Finally overcome, Quilago was taken captive and forced to marry Huayna Capac. In some accounts, the offspring of this union was the future emperor Atahualpa.

Quilago prepared a trap to murder Huayna Capac in her bedchamber, but was betrayed by her servants and executed. The defeat of Quilago enabled the Inca to extend their conquests to northernmost Ecuador, defeating the Caranqui in the battle of Yawarkucha.

This legend has deep roots in Ecuador. A Spanish chronicler described a performance in Quito in 1613 portraying the struggle between the Inca invader and Cochasqui and the relationship between the Inca Emperor and the warrior queen. The legend explains the national origin of Ecuador as a union between the conquering Incas and the Ecuadorian Indians who struggled against foreign domination and repression, first against the Incas and later against the Spanish. Cochasqui is an important place for ceremonies, traditional dances, shamanistic rituals, and marriages with the emphasis on getting in touch with the ancestry of the modern-day country of Ecuador.

References

Buildings and structures in Pichincha Province
Archaeological sites in Ecuador
Museums in Ecuador
Tourist attractions in Pichincha Province
Archaeological museums in Ecuador
Inca Empire